Ernst Eskhult  (October 20, 1880 - July 24, 1955) was a Swedish politician. He was a member of the Centre Party. He was a member of the Parliament of Sweden (upper chamber) from 1919.

Members of the Riksdag from the Centre Party (Sweden)
1880 births
1955 deaths
Members of the Första kammaren
People from Jönköping County